Anders Överström (born 25 November 1985 in Mariehamn in Åland, Finland) is a Finnish goalkeeper who currently is a free agent. He has played most of his career at the Mariehamn based club IFK Mariehamn, but has also represented IF Finströms Kamraterna, Hammarlands IK and FC Åland.

External links
 Player profile on the league's website

1985 births
Living people
People from Mariehamn
Finnish footballers
IFK Mariehamn players
Swedish-speaking Finns
Association football goalkeepers
FC Åland players
Sportspeople from Åland